Franklin A. Lindsay (12 March 1916 – 13 October 2011) was a spy and business executive. Lindsay graduated from Stanford University in 1938 and ended up working for the Office of Strategic Services during World War II. During the war he parachuted to the Slovene Partisans in 1944 and worked with them to blow up the rail lines in Southern Austria. Later, he became head of the military mission to Tito. He wrote a book about his wartime experiences, Beacons in the Night, and has been awarded Slovenia's highest decoration.

After the war, he became involved in a wide range of government and private sector activities. In the public sector, he was a member of the US Atomic Energy Commission to the United Nations; he helped set up the European side of the Marshall Plan and helped fellow OSSer Frank Wisner establish the Office of Policy Coordination (OPC). In the private sector he spent time at the Ford Foundation, McKinsey & Co., and as head of Itek, a high tech company, which, among its products, developed the camera's for satellites that overflew the Soviet Union and scouted the moon and Mars.  He also served on the Senate Intelligence Advisory Committee, chaired the committee for Economic Development's program and policy committee and chaired the board of the National Bureau of Economic Research.

After his retirement, he started a seven-year stint helping Ukraine's International Management Institute turn its curriculum towards a market economy. While in Kiev, he also worked with Ukraine's National Security Council and helped develop a program for Ukraine's military officers and national security officials at Harvard Kennedy School. The program continues today in an expanded form to include not only participants from Ukraine but also from the other countries surrounding the Black Sea.

He is survived by his wife Margot, two children, and three granddaughters.

References

External links
Register of the Franklin Lindsay Papers and selected documents online at the Hoover Institution Archives, Stanford University.

1916 births
2011 deaths
Stanford University alumni
World War II spies for the United States